Aykut Oray (13 October 1942 – 11 August 2009) was a Turkish actor active between 1963 and 2009. He was, perhaps, best known for his work on the Turkish dramatic comedy series, Bizimkiler. Oray also had a brief career in politics during his later life, becoming a member of the Republican People's Party.

Oray was born in Üsküdar, Istanbul, Turkey, on 13 October 1942. He had been a professional actor since 1963, appearing in both film and television roles.

Oray was found dead in his hotel room in Köyceğiz, Muğla Province, Turkey, on the Aegean Sea, on 11 August 2009. An autopsy carried out in Istanbul revealed that he had died of a heart attack. Oray had been staying in Köyceğiz while attending a local film festival. He was survived by his wife and two children.

Turkish Prime Minister Recep Tayyip Erdoğan sent condolences to Oray's family and the acting community saying, "I am deeply saddened by actor Aykut Oray’s death."

The leader of Turkey's Republican People's Party (CHP) Deniz Baykal also gave tribute to Oray, a member of the CHP, "Aykut Oray has shown his faith in an organized society and resolution in taking responsibility by joining the CHP. His death is a big loss for both the artistic community and the democratic political community."

Filmography
 Mezuniyet - 2009
 Hayal ve Gerçek - 2007
 Şarkılar Susmasın - 2006
 Janjan - 2006
 Eve Giden Yol 1914 - 2006
 Eksik Etek Şehmuz 2006
 Davetsiz Misafir - 2005
 Halk Düşmanı - 2004
 Uy Başuma Gelenler - 2004
 Ömerçip - 2002
 Koltuk Sevdası - 2001
 The Waterfall (Şellale) - 2001
 Şarkıcı - 2000
 Gurbetçiler - 1996
 Çiçek Taksi - 1995
 Zzzzt FM - 1994
 Rumuz Sev Beni - 1993
 Sevgili Ortak - 1993
 Yazlıkçılar - 1993
 Ana....Şehmuz - 1991
 Bir Milyara Bir Çocuk - 1990
 Bizimkiler - 1989
 Bir Garip Yolcu - 1972

References

External links

1942 births
2009 deaths
Turkish male film actors
Turkish male television actors
Male actors from Istanbul
Marmara University alumni